Bhakta Tukaram is a 1973 Indian Telugu-language biographical film based on the life of the saint-poet Tukaram, produced by P. Adinarayana Rao under the Anjali Pictures banner and directed by V. Madhusudhana Rao. It stars Akkineni Nageswara Rao, Anjali Devi and Sivaji Ganesan, with music also composed by Adinarayana Rao.

Plot
The film is based on the story of Bhakta Tukaram, an advent devotee of Lord Panduranga in the 17th century in Dehu village of present-day Maharashtra. Tukaram (Akkineni Nageswara Rao) a small trader, leads a family life with two wives Avalai Jija Bai (Anjali Devi) & Rukma Bai (Jr. Sreeranjani) and their two children. Tukaram is very kindhearted who ameliorates everyone in the village for which he absorbs his property. However, he is not interested in worldly matters and always immersed in the adoration of Lord. Mumbaji Go Swamy (Nagabhushanam) is the head of the village, behaves as a great preacher & disciple but actually, he is a decadent person, who misuses public faith for self-consumption. Tukaram always opposes his misdeeds, keeping the grudge in mind, Mumbaji troubles Tukaram a lot also propagates him as an atheist and ostracizes. Hence his family suffers from starving even no one comes forward to support him when his wife Rukma Bai passes away. Devastated Tukaram leaves the house to question the existence of God when Lord Panduranga (Nagaraju) appears and endorses to scripture his divinity as Abhangs. Now Tukaram awakes the devotion in people through his singing and becomes eminent which also impresses emperor Shivaji (Sivaji Ganesan) who facilitates him with material gifts but he refuses courteously.

At this point in time, Mumbaji's envy is bondless, so, he uses a brothel Bahina Bai (Kanchana) to lure Tukaram when he shows the reality of life that how her beauty shrinks in old age and makes her as his devotee. Thereafter, Mumbaji claims that Tukaram stole his verses when Pandit Rameswara Bhattar (Dhulipala) a religious authority arrives to examine who orders Tukaram to immerse his works into the river and never discuss religion in public which he does so. But river Ganga returns it back affirming it as a sacred when Rameswara Bhattar also becomes his devotee. Meanwhile, Mumbaji hides the Lord's statue from the temple, indicts Tukaram and complains to Shivaji. So, Shivaji lands at Dehu to test Tukaram and gives a day time to him to prove his innocence. Here Tukaram with his devotional power restores the statue. Right now, Mumbaji intrigues by informing Shivaji's presence in the village to the Mughals but God protects Shivaji at the behest of Tukaram. Knowing it, enraged Mughal Empire amputates Mumbaji which Tukaram retrieves and Mumbaji too bows his head down. At last, Lord invites Tukaram to Vaikuntha with the mortal body by sending his vehicle Garuda Vahana. Finally, the movie ends, Tukaram going to heaven, giving his ultimate preachings to follow piety, truth, peace, kindness & mercy.

Cast
Akkineni Nageswara Rao as Tukaram
Anjali Devi as Avali Bai
Sivaji Ganesan as Shivaji 
Nagabhushanam as Mumbaji Goswamy
Dhulipala as Rameswara Bhatta
Sakshi Ranga Rao as Nandi
Bhanu Prakash as Neeloji
Nagaraju as Lord Panduranga
P. J. Sarma as Gangadhar Pandit
Potti Prasad as Varaham
Kanchana as Bahina Bai
Sriranjani Jr. as Rukma Bai	
Baby Sridevi as Kaasi (Tukaram's daughter)

Production 
Akkineni Nageswara Rao played Tukaram, and Sivaji Ganesan played Shivaji without taking any remuneration for the film.

Soundtrack
Music composed by P. Adinarayana Rao.

References

External links
 

1973 films
1970s Telugu-language films
Indian biographical films
Films about Hinduism
History of India on film
Films directed by V. Madhusudhana Rao
Hindu devotional films
1970s biographical films
Cultural depictions of Shivaji